Jean-Sylvain Emien Mambé (born 16 September 1970) is an Ivorian prelate of the Catholic Church who works in the diplomatic service of the Holy See.

Biography
Jean-Sylvain Emien Mambé was born on 16 September 1970 in Jacqueville, Côte d'Ivoire. He was ordained a priest for the Diocese of Yopougon on 14 December 1997.

He entered the diplomatic service of the Holy See on 1 July 2005, and served in the pontifical representations in Angola, Nigeria, New Zealand, Spain, the Czech Republic, Guinea and Mali. He holds a degree in canon law.

On 2 February 2022, Pope Francis appointed him Titular Archbishop of Potenza Picena and Apostolic Nuncio to Mali. On 12 November 2022, he was appointed nuncio of Guinea as well.

See also
 List of heads of the diplomatic missions of the Holy See

References

Living people
1970 births
Apostolic Nuncios to Mali
Ivorian Roman Catholic archbishops